Gary Haisman  (29 January 1958 – 28 November 2018) was an English singer and one of three acts whose No. 1 songs on the Billboard Hot Dance Music/Club Play chart were featured on D Mob’s A Little Bit of This, a Little Bit of That album (the others being Cathy Dennis and LRS). His contribution to the set was the two-sided track “We Call It Acieed”/“Trance Dance”, which was the first of D Mob’s four straight No. 1 hits on the Dance chart in 1989.

See also
List of number-one dance hits (United States)
List of artists who reached number one on the US Dance chart

References

1958 births
2018 deaths
English male singers
English electronic musicians
English house musicians
Musicians from Buckinghamshire